Big Dan may refer to:

Big Dan (film), a 1923 film directed by William A. Wellman
Big Dan Mine, an abandoned mine in Temagami, Ontario, Canada
Big Dan Shear Zone, a geological feature in Temagami, Ontario, Canada
Dan O'Connor (prospector), a Canadian businessman and prospector
Dan Shanahan, an Irish sportsperson
Dan Brouthers, an American baseball player